Annabella, Anabella, or Anabela is a feminine given name. Notable people with the name include:

Annabella of Scotland (c. 1433–1509), daughter of King James I
Annabella (actress) (1907–1996), stage name of French actress Suzanne Georgette Charpentier
Anabela Atijas (born 1975), Serbian pop singer known mononymously as Anabela
Anabela Basalo (born 1972), Serbian writer
Anabela Braz Pires (born 1976), Portuguese singer known mononymously as Anabela
 Anabella Castro, Colombian model
Anabela Cossa (born 1986), Mozambican basketball player
Anabela Đogani (born 1975), Bosnian-Serbian singer
Anabella Drummond (c. 1350–1401), Queen Consort of Scotland
Annabella Lwin, (born 1966) Anglo-Burmese lead singer of Bow Wow Wow who sometimes records under the name "Annabella"
Annabella Piugattuk (born 1982), Canadian actress
Anabela Rodrigues (born 1954), Portuguese politician
Annabella Sciorra (born 1964), American actress
Bella Thorne (born 1997), American actress, dancer, singer and model

See also
Annabel (disambiguation)
Bella (disambiguation)

Feminine given names